The Broadcast Driver Architecture (BDA) is a Microsoft standard for digital video capture on Microsoft Windows operating systems. It encompasses the ATSC and DVB standards and gives developers a standardized method of accessing TV tuner devices (usually PCI, PCI-E or USB). It is the driver component of Microsoft TV Technologies, and is used by hardware vendors to create digital TV tuning devices for Windows, and also to support new network types or custom hardware functionality. BDA is documented in the Windows DDK (Driver Development Kit) and the Platform SDK. Ideally, any BDA-compliant software should be compatible with any BDA-compliant hardware.

Applications using BDA drivers include MSN TV (formerly Web TV) for Windows (built into Windows 98 and Windows Me), Windows XP Media Center Edition, MediaPortal, GB-PVR, DVBViewer, ULENet and several such other third-party solutions.

Broadcast Driver Architecture was introduced in Windows 98 as part of the Windows Driver Model.

See also 
 Windows Driver Model (WDM)

External links 
 Microsoft TV and Broadcast Driver Architecture
 Protected Broadcast Driver Architecture Extensions to BDA for DRM
 Microsoft BDA Reference
 Open Source BDA drivers and tools

Microsoft application programming interfaces
Device drivers